Screenlife may refer to:

 Screenlife film format, also known as "computer screen film"
 Paramount Digital Entertainment, formerly Screenlife Games